Semisulcospira decipiens is a species of freshwater snail with an operculum, an aquatic gastropod mollusk in the family Semisulcospiridae.

Taxonomy
Type specimen were collected during the Vega Expedition led by Adolf Erik Nordenskiöld in 1878–1880. This species was originally described under the name Melania niponica var. decipiens by Swedish malacologist Carl Agardh Westerlund in 1883.

Semisulcospira decipiens belong to the Semisulcospira niponica species group.

Distribution 
This species occurs in the Lake Biwa and in the Yodo River, Japan.

The type locality is the lake Biwa.

References

External links

Semisulcospiridae